Mahabad Culture and Technology Centre ( – Kesht va Şanʿat-e Mahābād) is a village and culture and technology centre in Mokriyan-e Gharbi Rural District, in the Central District of Mahabad County, West Azerbaijan Province, Iran. At the 2006 census, its population was 159, in 38 families.

References 

Populated places in Mahabad County